Alpinacris crassicauda is a species of grasshopper only known from West Coast Region and Tasman Region, New Zealand. The genus Alpinacris is endemic to the South Island of New Zealand. A. crassicauda was described in 1967 by Robert Sidney Bigelow, with a type locality of Lead Hills, Boulder Lake. A male holotype and paratype are deposited in the Canterbury Museum, Christchurch. Like all of New Zealand sub-alpine and alpine grasshoppers A. crassicauda has a 2 or 3 years life cycle. The eggs must ‘overwinter’ before they will hatch. Hoppers are found throughout the year and adult grasshoppers can be found throughout the New Zealand summer between December and April. The adult A. crassicauda do not overwinter.

Distribution and habitat

Alpinacris crassicauda is only known from West Coast Region and Tasman Region of New Zealand. It can be found as far south as the Right Branch of the Rahu River, Spring Junction and as far north as the Thousand Acres Plateau, Matiri Range.

Species description
The wings on A. tumidicauda are micropterous (small wings) between  making this species flightless like most of New Zealand grasshoppers. Male body length ; Female body length .

Type information
Bigelow, R.S. 1967: The Grasshoppers of New Zealand, Their Taxonomy and Distribution. University of Canterbury, Christchurch.
Type locality: Lead Hills, Boulder Lake, Tasman Region. 
Type specimen: Male; 27 October 1963; P. M. & M Johns. Holotype and Paratype are deposited in the Canterbury Museum, Christchurch.

References

Acrididae of New Zealand
Endemic fauna of New Zealand
Insects described in 1967
Acrididae
Endemic insects of New Zealand